The Komikazen International Reality Comics Festival was an annual festival focusing on non-fiction comics. It occurred every year between 2005 and 2016 in Ravenna, Italy, usually in the month of October. Komikazen was sponsored by the Mirada Association and organized by Elettra Stamboulis and Gianluca Costantini.

"Created with the aim of researching and investigating the relationships between the presentation of reality and graphic literature," the festival was intended to promote and celebrate Ravenna as the capital of "reality-based" comics. The festival had no commercial areas, but instead focused on exhibitions, workshops, and discussions.

As in the French city of Angoulême during the Angoulême International Comics Festival, shops in Ravenna often customized their window displays with comics themes during the festival period. Related exhibitions in various venues in the Ravenna area generally remained on display for at least a month after the festival.

History 
Mirada ("look" in Spanish) was founded in 1997 and moved to Ravenna in 2000. Its mission is to identify and promote young artists from the Ravenna region. Mirada was part of the Periscopages Association (based in Rennes, France), an organization devoted to independent comics that included Babel (Athens, Greece), Comica (London, UK), Chili cum Carne (Lisbon, Portugal), the Boom Festival (St. Petersburg, Russia), and La Maison du Livre (Beirut, Lebanon). Periscopages Association disbanded in 2012.

The first Komikazen was held on September 30, 2005, with special guests Phoebe Gloeckner, Joe Sacco, and Marjane Satrapi.

The 2006 festival featured Turkish cartoonists of the long-running comics magazine Leman.

In 2007, the festival expanded to two days, and inaugurated the GEAR Awards, celebrating young artists of the local Emilia-Romagna region. In attendance were more than 50 artists from the nonfiction comics magazines Strapazin (Switzerland), Babel (Athens), Glomp (Finland), Chili Com Carne (Portugal), Hard Comics (Romania), and Stripoteka (Sarajevo, Bosnia). The  exhibition Honey Talks was sponsored by Stripburger. Artists featured in the exhibition included Danijel Zezelj, Rutu Modan, and Matthias Lehmann.

The 2008 festival featured the first exhibition of Lebanese cartoonists in Italy.

The 2009 show focused on stories that "originate with individual tension, research and experimentation."

The 2010 Komikazen expanded to three days.

The theme of the 2012 festival was the representations of Italy and featured more thirty Italian cartoonists and caricaturists: Luca Amerio, Luca Baino, Francesco Barilli, Paolo Bacilieri, Lelio Bonaccorso, Riccardo Cecchetti, Sara Colaone, Paolo Cossi, Gianluca Costantini, Manuel De Carli, Matteo Fenoglio Luca Ferrara, Manfredi Giffoni, Rocco Lombardi, Simone Lucciola, Riccardo Mannelli, Giuseppe Palumbo, Paolo Parisi, Luigi Politano, Tuono Pettinato, Marco Pugliese, Davide Reviati, Marco Rizzo, Luca Salici, Caterina Sansone, Leonora Sartori, Pietro Scarnera, Elettra Stamboulis, Mattia Surroz, Alessandro Tota, Bepi Vigna, Andrea Vivaldo, Zerocalcare, Andrea Zoli. In addition, Komikazen  was final event in the Italian national competition "Reality Draws."

The 2013 festival was themed in solidarity with the Occupy movement—99 cartoonists came to Ravenna and made work related to the concept of "We are the 99%."

The theme of the 2014 festival was autobiography and biography. Headline guests included Eddie Campbell and Gipi.

The 2015 festival featured special guests Ted Rall and Carlos Latuff.

The final Komikazen festival was held June 20–22, 2016.

Official prizes
The GAER (Giovani Artisti dell'Emilia Romagna) prize is awarded to young cartoonists of the Emilia-Romagna region, whose work is then published in time for the following year's festival. Award ceremonies and exhibitions are held at the Ravenna Office of Youth Policy.

 2007 — awarded to Marino Neri and Leonardo Guardigli, whose work was published by Kappa Edizioni and Centro Fumetto Andrea Pazienza respectively
 2008 — Marina Girardi, published by Comma 22
 2009 — Pietro Scarnera, published by Comma 22
 2010 — Fabio Sera, published by Comma 22
 2011 — Andrea Zoli, published by Comma 22
 2012 — Jacopo Frey and Nicola Gobbi, published by Comma 22

Locations and dates

See also
 European comics
 Lucca Comics & Games

References

External links
 Mirada Association website

Comics conventions
Cultural festivals in Italy
Defunct multigenre conventions
Recurring events established in 2005
Tourist attractions in Emilia-Romagna
Festivals in Italy
2005 establishments in Italy